Otopharynx pachycheilus (rubberlip hap) is a cichlid endemic to Lake Malawi.  This species can reach a length of  TL.

References

pachycheilus
Fish of Lake Malawi
Fish of Malawi
Fish described in 2001
Taxonomy articles created by Polbot